This is a list of countries by cucumber production from the years 2016 to 2020, based on data from the Food and Agriculture Organization Corporate Statistical Database. The estimated total world production for cucumbers in 2020 was 91,258,272 metric tonnes, up 3.7% from 87,976,103 tonnes in 2019. China was by far the largest producer, accounting for nearly 80% of global production at 72,779,781 tonnes. Dependent territories are shown in italics.

Production by country

>500,000 tonnes

100,000–500,000 tonnes

50,000–100,000 tonnes

10,000–50,000 tonnes

1,000–10,000 tonnes

<1,000 tonnes

Notes

References 

Cucumber
Cucumbers
Cucumbers
Cucumbers